James Jackson (8 July 1908 – 22 January 1977) was a Canadian cyclist. He competed in the individual and team road race events at the 1932 Summer Olympics.

References

External links
 

1908 births
1977 deaths
Canadian male cyclists
Olympic cyclists of Canada
Cyclists at the 1932 Summer Olympics
Cyclists from Saskatchewan
20th-century Canadian people